Gern Blandsten Records is an independent record label based in Paramus, New Jersey.

The label's acts have included The World/Inferno Friendship Society, Canyon, Chisel, the Van Pelt, Radio 4, The Flesh, Weston, Native Nod and Rye Coalition. Gern Blandsten also released the debut albums by Ted Leo and the Pharmacists, Liars and Dälek.

The label was founded by Rorschach's Charles Maggio in 1992, and is named after a character in a Steve Martin comedy routine from his 1979 album Comedy Is Not Pretty!.

See also
 List of record labels

External links
 Official site

References

Record labels established in 1992
American independent record labels
Rock record labels
Indie rock record labels
American record labels